Conrad Johan (John) Immanuel Bergendoff (December 3, 1895 –December 23, 1997) was an American Lutheran theologian and historian. He served as the fifth president of Augustana College in Rock Island, Illinois from 1935 to 1962.

Early life 
Conrad Bergendoff was born in Shickley, Nebraska, to Carl August and Emma Mathilda Fahlberg Bergendoff. He spent his youth in Middletown, Connecticut. He graduated from Augustana College, Rock Island, Illinois in 1915 and earned his M.A. at the University of Pennsylvania in 1916. He returned to Rock Island to complete the B. Div. degree at the [Augustana Theological Seminary.
Bergendoff was ordained into the ministry of the Augustana Lutheran Synod on June 12, 1921, in Chicago. He pursued advanced study at Sweden's Uppsala University, serving as personal secretary to Swedish Archbishop Nathan Söderblom during the Stockholm Conference on  Life and Work in 1925. He earned his Ph.D. from the University of Chicago in 1928.

Career 
Bergendoff became dean of the Augustana Theological Seminary in 1931, and was elected to succeed Gustav Andreen as president of Augustana College in 1935.  He saw the college through the difficult years of the Great Depression, through its separation from Augustana Theological Seminary in 1948, and into a long period of substantial growth and increasing prestige.

Among his most notable achievements was the ecumenical spirit he engendered in American Lutherans from the late 1930s going forward.  Instrumental in gathering together the myriad branches of the European immigrant Lutheran bodies, Bergendoff used his considerable influence and power within the Augustana Synod to help unite those  Swedish-background churches into the United Lutheran Church in America (1962-1987), a precursor of the current Evangelical Lutheran Church in America.  Bergendoff also devoted considerable attention to the ecumenical movement between major Protestant denominations, and on a more local and regional level he made many inroads towards official cooperation with leaders of conservative and reformed movements in American Judaism.

Selected works
The Church of the Lutheran Reformation: A Historical Survey of Lutheranism (Saint Louis, Concordia Pub. House, 1967)
Olavus Petri and the ecclesiastical transformation in Sweden, 1521-1552: a study in the Swedish Reformation (Philadelphia, Fortress Press, 1965)
 The Doctrine of the Church in American Lutheranism (Philadelphia, Muhlenberg Press, 1947)

Recognition 
In recognition for his work, Bergendoff received six honorary doctorates throughout his life, including one from Sweden's Uppsala University.  The fine arts building at Augustana College, constructed during his presidency, was named the Bergendoff Hall of Fine Arts. The Lutheran noted Bergendoff as "one of the most influential people in 20th-century American Lutheranism".

Personal life 
As a young pastor in Chicago he met and married Gertrude Elizabeth Carlson of Rockford, Illinois, the daughter of Swedish immigrants.  Their children were Conrad  born in 1924, Beatrice born in 1928, and Elizabeth born in 1937.  Bergendoff and his wife were the grandparents to nine grandchildren and seven great-grandchildren.

References

Other sources 
Tredway, Thomas  (2014) Conrad Bergendoff's Faith and Work. A Swedish-American Lutheran, 1895-1997 (Augustana Historical Society)

External links 
 Finding aid for the Conrad Bergendoff papers (1915-1985), held by Augustana Special Collections, Rock Island, Illinois.

1895 births
1997 deaths
Augustana College (Illinois) alumni
Augustana College (Illinois) faculty
Presidents of Augustana College (Illinois)
Place of death missing
American centenarians
Men centenarians
American people of Swedish descent
American Lutheran theologians
Lutheran pacifists
Uppsala University alumni
University of Chicago
20th-century Lutherans
20th-century American academics